Sung Wong Toi is an underground MTR rapid transit station in Hong Kong on the , located in Ma Tau Chung in Kowloon City District. The station also serves Kowloon City and Ma Tau Wai via a pedestrian tunnel. The station was constructed by a Samsung–Hsin Chong joint venture.

Location
The original KCR plans had the station near the intersection of Sung Wong Toi Road and To Kwa Wan Road in the old Kai Tak Airport tarmac, but the location was moved nearer to the junction of to leave wan and Sung Wong Toi Road. The location will be roughly at the western end of the former Kai Tak Airport terminal footprint and the start of runway 13/31, which today has become the western part of the Kai Tak Development area.

Naming
This station is located geographically closer to Ma Tau Chung than To Kwa Wan. During the planning and construction phases, "To Kwa Wan" was originally chosen for this station and "Ma Tau Wai" for the adjacent station, which is in To Kwa Wan. In a future network map revealed by the MTR to the public on 23 September 2017, the station name was changed to that of the nearby landmark Sung Wong Toi, an important historic relic of Song Dynasty Emperor Duanzong. However, the MTR Corporation stated that the name was "for internal reference" and that no final decision would be made until 2018.

On 27 November 2017, the Transport and Housing Bureau announced that the names of both stations were finalised according to the "internal reference", and that the names reflected public concern over geographical accuracy, the historical significance of the monolith, and the integration of the railway structures with the local community.

Archaeological discovery

On 21 April 2014, construction workers discovered six wells and thousands of artefacts dating back to the Song dynasty. Construction was halted for months while archaeological assessment was being done. This discovery led to an 11-month delay and an additional cost of 3 billion Hong Kong dollars to the construction project. The government plans to preserve at least one of the wells on-site and incorporate it into the station design. About 400 pieces of the 700 thousand unearthed relics such as coins and ceramic wares were selected and exhibited in the concourse of this station for a limited period.

Station layout
This station is located underground with one island platform and three exits, with a fourth under planning.

Exits
A: Dakota Drive 
B1: Chun Seen Mei Chuen
B2: Prince Edward Road West 
B3: Kowloon City
C: (Opening Delayed, Under Planning)
D: Sung Wong Toi Garden

Gallery

References

External links

 Sung Wong Toi Station - Official Tuen Ma Line website

MTR stations in Kowloon
Sha Tin to Central Link
Tuen Ma line
Ma Tau Chung
Ma Tau Wai
Kowloon City